Bad Robot is an American film and television production company founded on May 27, 1999 and led by J. J. Abrams and Katie McGrath as Co-CEO. Under its Bad Robot Productions division, the company is responsible for the television series Alias, Lost, Fringe, Person of Interest, Revolution, and Westworld alongside the feature-length films Cloverfield, Star Trek, Super 8, Star Trek Into Darkness, Mission: Impossible – Ghost Protocol, Mission: Impossible – Rogue Nation, Star Wars Episodes VII and IX, 10 Cloverfield Lane, Star Trek Beyond, The Cloverfield Paradox, Mission: Impossible – Fallout, and Overlord.

History

Bad Robot was originally based at Touchstone Television, but was moved by Abrams to Paramount Pictures and Warner Bros. Television, after his contract with ABC expired in 2006. Bad Robot produced Lost in association with ABC Studios, formerly Touchstone Television. The two companies jointly produced Six Degrees and What About Brian. The deal was first recommended and presented in 1999 as part of a presentation deal, with J.J. Abrams being contracted to Disney. In 2004, Thom Sherman joined Bad Robot Television as president of the studio. The company had developed presentation pitches for ABC and The WB, none of them would eventually got to series.

Abrams is Chairman and Co-Chief executive officer of Bad Robot, and Katie McGrath serves as the Company's Co-Chief executive officer. In June 2017, Bad Robot announced that Brian Weinstein would become President and Chief Operating Officer, overseeing daily operations and spearhead the company's growth strategy in its existing businesses, while developing new areas of expansion across the entire Bad Robot platform and pursuing alternative financing options. In May 2015, Ben Stephenson left the BBC where he had been head of drama to helm Bad Robot Television. Lindsey Weber leads Bad Robot's feature film division.

The production logo has appeared since 2001, featuring a red rectangular headed robot running through a meadow silhouetted until it appears suddenly in front of the camera, followed by voices provided by two of Abrams's children, Henry and Gracie Abrams, saying "Bad robot!" Although some fans believe that the name comes from a line in the animated film The Iron Giant, Abrams told Entertainment Weekly that it simply came to him during a writers' meeting.

In February 2013, it was announced that Bad Robot would be partnering with the Valve Corporation to produce possibly a Half-Life or Portal film in the distant future. In August 2015, Valve released a new beta game mode to Team Fortress 2, PASS Time, which Bad Robot worked on. On July 7, 2016, the PASS Time game mode became official. Bad Robot released a trailer entitled "Stranger" (otherwise known as S.), rumoured to be Abrams' next film or television project, perhaps even a Lost spin-off, but it was finally explained to be promoting S., Abrams and Doug Dorst's new novel, as a new trailer for S. was released. In February 2017, it was announced Julius Avery is attached to direct a Paramount coproduction, the World War II zombie film Overlord, from screenwriter Billy Ray.

Bad Robot Productions is currently based in Santa Monica, California, in a building which is incorrectly labeled on purpose as the home of the fictional "National Typewriter Company" because Abrams "likes typewriters — and misdirection."

In June 2018, the company announced a spin-off venture formed with the Chinese video game publisher Tencent to launch Bad Robot Games for the development of video games on mobile, computer and consoles, with Warner Bros. Interactive Entertainment as a minority investor. Bad Robot Games will develop and publish titles related to Abrams' works and other Bad Robot Production contents, with Tencent holding the rights for distribution in China. The division will be helmed by Dave Baronoff, who has worked on the Cloverfield franchise and in developing Spyjinx as a joint project between Bad Robot Productions and Epic Games (also partially owned by Tencent), while Tim Keenan, who helped develop Duskers, will serve as the creative director.

In 2006, Bad Robot teamed up with Paramount Pictures and Warner Bros. Television for a $60 million development deal  that lasted through 2018.

In late 2018, it was announced that Bad Robot was leaving Paramount and seeking a new overall deal. In January 2019, it was announced that Universal, Disney, and Warner Bros. were the top three studios battling it out for what could be a record breaking overall deal including theme parks, music labels, TV, merchandising, and streaming services as Bad Robot plans on ramping up production significantly in the coming years. It was also announced that Bad Robot would be co-producing a remake of the British series The Wrong Mans for American network Showtime along with BBC Studios, but Showtime later cancelled the project.

Bad Robot launched a subsidiary record label called Loud Robot in late 2018, in partnership with Capitol Music Group. Loud Robot is headed by co-general managers McKee Floyd and Nicky Berger along with Charles Scott, who currently heads Bad Robot's music division and has been the leading music supervisor for the company's films.  Artists signed to the label include Cleveland-born rapper Nnena, neo soul singer/songwriter UMI, Nashville, Tennessee-based alternative rock artist Chaz Cardigan, and London-based rhythm and blues artist DWY.

On September 12, 2019, Bad Robot officially announced a new five-year overall deal with WarnerMedia.  According to The Hollywood Reporter, WarnerMedia agreed to pay Bad Robot at least $250 million (plus various financial incentives) to produce feature films, television shows, video games, and digital content.

On May 25, 2021, Abrams announced that a Portal film adaptation, which has been in development since 2013, was still in production and a script has been written for the film. In November 2021, the company launched its podcast division with a multi-year first-look deal at Spotify.

On April 25, 2022, it was announced that Bad Robot will team up with Mattel Films and Warner Bros. Pictures to produce a live-action Hot Wheels film based on the toy line of the same name.

Productions

Films

Upcoming films

TV series

Upcoming series

Shorts

Video games

Awards and recognition
Nominations
 2002 Emmy Award Nomination, Outstanding Writing for A Drama Series (Alias)
 2005 Emmy Award Nomination, Outstanding Writing for A Drama Series (Lost)
 2007 Golden Globe Award Nomination, Best Television Series – Drama (Lost)

Wins
 2005 Emmy Award Winner, Outstanding Drama Series (Lost)
 2005 Emmy Award Winner, Outstanding Directing for A Drama Series (Lost)
 2006 Golden Globe Award Winner, Best Television Series – Drama (Lost)

References

External links
 
 
 iOS App Action Movie FX.  On iTunes https://itunes.apple.com/us/app/action-movie-fx/id489321253?mt=8
 
 

 
Film production companies of the United States
Television production companies of the United States
J. J. Abrams
Companies based in Santa Monica, California
Mass media companies established in 1999